Weekdone is an internal communication service for teams founded in 2012 that is based in Tartu, Estonia. It enables the OKR goal-setting and Progress, plans, problems weekly reporting methodologies.

History
In November 2013 Weekdone won the pitching contest of Slush Helsinki, the largest tech and startup conference in Northern Europe.

The company has raised an investment round of $200,000 (€148,000). The funding was led by Jérémie Berrebi and Xavier Niel's KIMA Ventures, and also included investments by the existing founders, Skype/Kazaa founding engineer and chief architect Ahti Heinla, Rubylight venture fund, and Taavi Lepmets, a former backer of Odnoklassniki, Russia’s largest social network.

References

External links

Technology companies of Estonia